The Standard-Times, The Standard Times, or Standard-Times may refer to:
 The Standard-Times (New Bedford), newspaper based in New Bedford, Massachusetts
 The Standard Times (North Kingstown), newspaper based in North Kingstown, Rhode Island
 San Angelo Standard-Times, newspaper based in San Angelo, Texas